Brunswick River is a river in the South West region of Western Australia.

The river rises in the Darling Range then flows south-west discharging into the Collie River near Australind.

The river was named in 1830 by Lieutenant-Governor James Stirling after Ernest Augustus, King of Hanover, Duke of Brunswick and Lüneburg, the fifth son and eighth child of George III. Over a period of 5 days in December 1813, while in command of H. M. Sloop Brazen, Captain Stirling took the Duke and his entourage to Wijk aan Zee in Holland.

The Brunswick has six tributaries; Wellesley River, Ernest River, Elvira Gully, Augustus River, Frederic River and Lunenburgh River.

References 

Rivers of the South West region